The Fifth Encirclement Campaign is an abbreviated name used for several different encirclement campaigns launched by the Nationalist Government with the goal of destroying the developing Chinese Red Army and its communist bases in several separate locations in China during the early stage of the Chinese Civil War between the late 1920s to mid-1930s, and these are:

Fifth Encirclement Campaign against Jiangxi Soviet, September 25, 1933 - October 10, 1934
Fifth Encirclement Campaign against Hubei-Henan-Anhui Soviet, July 17, 1933, to November 26, 1934